Qezel Dagh-e Kord (also Romanized as Qezel Dāgh-e Kord and Qezeldāgh-e Kord) is a village in Chaybasar-e Jonubi Rural District, in the Central District of Maku County, West Azerbaijan Province, Iran. At the 2006 census, its population was 838, in 141 families.

References 

Populated places in Maku County